Milli İdärä was the national government of Muslim Turko-Tatars of Inner Russia and Siberia that was elected by the delegates of Millät Mäclese and located in Ufa (Öfä) from January 11, 1918, to April 21, 1918. Its Chairman was Sadri Mäqsudi, with  being deputy chairman.

Its official press organ was "Möxtäriät" (Autonomy) journal.

Three ministries (departments) were created within Milli İdärä:
 Education Ministry (Mäğärif Näzäräte, Chairman – Näcip Qorbanğälief, members – , Ğäli Yänekäyef, İsmäğil Ütämeşef, Ğömär Tereğulof);
 Ministry of Religious Affairs (Diniä Näzäräte, Chairman –  (mufti), members (qadis) – Riza'etdin Fäxretdin, Salixcan Urmanof, Käşşaf Tärcemani, Ğabdulla Söläymani).

In April 1918, activities of Milli Idärä were banned by the Soviet government (except for Diniä Näzäräte, which was allowed to continue its activities with the condition of non-interference in political affairs), and its property was confiscated; some of the members resumed their activities in Petropavlovsk, until it was captured by the Bolsheviks.

References

External links
 
 
 

History of Tatarstan
History of Bashkortostan